Merge to Fairfield, Hyde County, North Carolina?

Fairfield Historic District is a national historic district located at Fairfield, Hyde County, North Carolina. The district encompasses 54 contributing buildings, 1 contributing site, and 1 contributing structure in the village of Fairfield. The district includes notable examples of Italianate and Carpenter Gothic style architecture dating to the last half of the 19th century. It was added to the National Register of Historic Places in 1985. 

Notable buildings include the Blackwell-Carter-Midyette House (1850s), Dr. Patrick Simmons House (1871), Carter~Holton-Sears House (c. 1890), Fairfield Methodist Episcopal Church (1877), E. S. O'Neal And Sons Store, Calhoun Brown Store, Fairfield Cemetery Pavilion, and Carter-Swindell House (1870s).

References

Buildings and structures in Hyde County, North Carolina
Historic districts on the National Register of Historic Places in North Carolina
National Register of Historic Places in Hyde County, North Carolina
Carpenter Gothic architecture in North Carolina
Italianate architecture in North Carolina